Poliaenus negundo is a species of beetle in the family Cerambycidae. It was described by Schaeffer in 1905. It is known from Mexico and the United States.

References

Pogonocherini
Beetles described in 1905